Macho Man is the second studio album by Village People, released on February 27, 1978. The album gained success due to its hit singles, "Macho Man" (US Billboard pop chart No. 25) and "Key West". Rolling Stone said of the album, "It seems certain to become the first out-and-out disco album without John Travolta on its cover ever to be certified platinum".

The album was reissued on CD in 1999.

Background 
Village People began in 1977 as a studio project of French producers Jacques Morali, Henri Belolo and lead singer Victor Willis. Village People’s first album, Village People, was recorded by Willis with the help of studio musicians. After the success of that album, Morali and Belolo received numerous requests for live performances. In response, Morali and Belolo began to work on the formation of a full group of singers and dancers. They placed an ad in New York theatre trade magazines that read: "Macho Types Wanted: Must Dance and Have a Moustache".

Randy Jones, known as the cowboy member of Village People, explains that "there was a dire need to have six capable performers to breathe life into the fantasies of the music and to sing, promote, and bring the concept of Village People to television and to the live performance onstage." The new line-up of Willis, Jones, Glenn Hughes, Felipe Rose, David Hodo and Alex Briley made its debut on the cover of the already-recorded album Macho Man.

Track listing

Charts

Weekly charts

Year-end charts

Certifications and sales

References

External links
 Macho Man at Discogs

1978 albums
Village People albums
Casablanca Records albums
Albums produced by Jacques Morali